Nevada High School may refer to:

 Nevada High School (Arkansas), based in Nevada County, Arkansas.
 Nevada  High School (Iowa), based in Nevada, Iowa.
 Nevada  High School (Missouri), based in Nevada, Missouri.
 Nevada State High School, based in Henderson, Nevada.
 Nevada Union  High School, based in Grass Valley, California (near the Sierra Nevada foothills).